Mohd Arsyah Mohd Ayob also known as Acha (born 26 August 1980) in Kajang, Selangor D.E. He is a former member of the Malaysian national team who still active in professional football career and currently playing for Malaysia League club, KL S.P.A Putrajaya as a midfielder.

Career
Arsyah Ayob started his career with Selangor F.A president squad before jump into professional career almost for 3 years with Melaka F.A starting 2002. Arsyah Ayob has been played as loan player for Sabah F.A in 2004 for Malaysia CUP before been offered into full squad on the following year.

The best moment on his professional football career by winning a Malaysia CUP and in the same year his team Perlis F.A took second Runner-up in Malaysia FA CUP in 2006.

Joined Brunei DPMM F.C in 2007 before transfer to Armed Forces FA (ATM) and on-loan with Sarawak F.A during Malaysia CUP Campaign. He has been playing for Perak F.A, and before he joined Penang F.A in 2011 again another achievement in winning Malaysia Premier League title with FELDA United F.C in 2010.

Arsyah Ayob is now played for KL S.P.A Putrjaya since 2013 and looking forward into the next level of his professional career in a sport his love.

Arsyah Ayob also have 4 caps with Malaysia national team and contributed 1 goal during match again Singapore F.A in Tiger Causeway Challenge.

Arsyah Ayob have been appointed as Hulu Langat F.C Head Coach in 2014 for the SUKSES (Kejohanan Sukan Selangor) tournament and taking 4th place for his first appearance and comeback on the following year to claim the championship title in 2015. This year 2016 Hulu Langat F.C will compete for Liga Bolasepak Rakyat and once again Arsyah Ayob will be the head coach for the campaign. Good luck for both Arsyah Ayob and Hulu Langat F.C for the LBR league cup Liga Bolasepak Rakyat.

Managerial Record
:

External links
 
Mohd Arsyah Ayob as Head Coach Hulu Langat F.C
Arsyah Ayob - Self Determination

1980 births
Living people
DPMM FC players
Association football midfielders
Malaysian footballers
Malaysia international footballers
Expatriate footballers in Brunei
Melaka United F.C. players
Sabah F.C. (Malaysia) players
Penang F.C. players